Ode Music is a Will Oldham LP released in 2000. It is the soundtrack to the film of the same name by Kelly Reichardt. The LP is entirely instrumental, featuring primarily acoustic guitar, piano, and organ.

The album's cover art is by film director Todd Haynes.

Track listing
"Ode #1" – 7:41
"Ode #2" – 4:07
"Ode #3" – 2:03
"Ode #4" – 3:19
"Ode #1a" - 2:51
"Ode #1b" - 3:31
"Ode #2a" - 2:33
"Ode #5" - 2:40
"Ode #3a" - 1:56
"Ode #4a" - 3:01

References

Will Oldham albums
2000 albums
Drag City (record label) albums